Clostridium estertheticum is an anaerobic, psychrophilic, motile, spore-forming Gram-positive bacterium.

References

Further reading

External links
 
 Type strain of Clostridium estertheticum at BacDive -  the Bacterial Diversity Metadatabase

Gram-positive bacteria
Bacteria described in 2003
estertheticum